Eudasyphora cyanicolor is a species of fly which is distributed across many parts the Palaearctic.

References

Muscidae
Diptera of Europe
Insects described in 1845
Taxa named by Johan Wilhelm Zetterstedt